Philip Bale was an Oxford college head in the 16th-century.

Bale was  educated at Exeter College, Oxford; and was Rector of Exeter College, Oxford, from 1521 to 1526. He held the living at St  Michael, Honiton and St Nicholas, Combe Raleigh.

References

Alumni of Exeter College, Oxford
Rectors of Exeter College, Oxford
16th-century English people